Chubin is a surname. Notable people with the surname include:

Shahram Chubin, Swiss author and academic
Steve Chubin (born 1944), American basketball player
Yakov Chubin (1893–1956), Soviet politician